Kevin Korchinski (born June 21, 2004) is a Canadian ice hockey defenceman for the Seattle Thunderbirds of the Western Hockey League (WHL) as a prospect to the Chicago Blackhawks of the National Hockey League (NHL). He was drafted seventh overall by the Blackhawks in the 2022 NHL Entry Draft.

Playing career
On August 11, 2022, Korchinski signed a three-year, entry-level contract with the Chicago Blackhawks.

International play

 

On December 12, 2022, Korchinski was named to Team Canada to compete at the 2023 World Junior Ice Hockey Championships. During the tournament he recorded one goal and three assists in seven games and won a gold medal.

Career statistics

Regular season and playoffs

International

References

External links 

2004 births
Living people
Canadian ice hockey defencemen
Chicago Blackhawks draft picks
Ice hockey people from Saskatchewan
National Hockey League first-round draft picks
Seattle Thunderbirds players